Nekunam Puram is a village and is part of valetivari Palem mandal and Kandukur taaluk in Prakasam district in the Indian state of Andhra Pradesh.

Demographics
Nekunam Puram had a population of approximately 1,584. Males constitute 55% of the population and females 45%. Nekunam Puram has an average literacy rate of 70%, higher than the national average of 59.5%: male literacy is 72%, and female literacy is 55%. In Nekunam Puram, 100% of the children's go to English Medium school.

References

Villages in Prakasam district